Dadoani tribe is a branch of "Hoth" Baloch tribe which is found in Balochistan, south Punjab and northern Sindh.

See also
Malik Sohrab Dodai

Notes

External links
 Official Website of Khosa Tribe Worldwide
 Khoso Community, Forums
 Khan Sahib Shahal Khan Khoso (Prominent people in Sindh)

Baloch tribes

pnb:کھوسہ
ur:کھوسہ